The Reversal is the 22nd novel by American author Michael Connelly and features the third major appearance of Los Angeles criminal defense attorney Michael "Mickey" Haller. Connelly introduced Haller in his bestselling 2005 novel The Lincoln Lawyer and then paired him with LAPD detective Harry Bosch, his half-brother, in 2008's The Brass Verdict.  In 2009's 9 Dragons, Haller was a secondary character as Bosch's personal lawyer. The Reversal was published in the United States on October 5, 2010.

Plot summary
Mickey Haller, who has become increasingly frustrated in his role as a defense lawyer, agrees to undertake the prosecution role on behalf of the city of Los Angeles, in the retrial of a convicted kidnapper and killer that had been granted as a result of new DNA evidence.  His one condition before accepting the task is that he is permitted to choose his own team; he chooses his ex-wife Maggie McPherson as his co-prosecutor, and his half-brother Harry Bosch as his investigator from the LAPD.  The prosecution case rests largely on the testimony of Sarah Gleason, the elder sister of the victim, Melissa Landy.

The body of 12-year-old Melissa was discovered in 1986, discarded in a dumpster, only a few hours after she was reported missing.  Unbeknownst to the killer, her older sister Sarah had been hiding in the garden and had witnessed her abduction.  On the day of the murder, she identified Jason Jessup, a tow truck driver, as the man who snatched Melissa from the garden.  The evidence against Jessup also includes strands of Melissa's hair, found in the seat of his truck.  Thus, her testimony is essential for establishing the quick police focus on Jessup.  However, DNA evidence subsequently showed that semen stains found on the dress Melissa was wearing, which could not be definitely matched at the time, came not from Jessup, but from the girls' stepfather.

Jessup's defense counsel, "Clever Clive" Royce, mounts a media campaign in his client's favour, and it becomes clear that his main motivation is obtaining a sizable compensation payout from the state.  Haller's response is to allow bail and have Jessup tailed by the police in the hope that he will return to his old ways and provide additional support for the prosecution case.  Jessup is soon seen visiting various mountain trails in the Mulholland area, and on one occasion parks his car outside Bosch's house at night.  Bosch and Haller, both concerned for their own teenage daughters' safety, develop a theory that Jessup was a serial killer but are unable to investigate fully for fear of blowing the police's cover.

Legal procedures require that the jury is kept ignorant of Jessup's post-conviction history.  Testimony given in the original trial, where the witness is no longer available because of death or infirmity, has to be read aloud to the jury by Harry Bosch, but the key to the case is still Sarah Gleason's testimony.  During direct examination, Sarah admits that the dress Melissa was wearing was hers and that her stepfather was raping her, which accounted for the semen stains.  The defense focuses on presenting the stepfather as the real killer and Jessup as the victim of the family's lies.  To undermine Sarah's testimony, because of her history of drug use and prostitution in the years since her sister's murder (though she has now been rehabilitated), Haller concludes that "Clever Clive" must have a witness who will claim that Sarah had told a different story during her "lost years."  Bosch then traces Sarah's then-lover, Eddie Roman, and finds that he has remained a drug addict living off a prostitute's earnings but has disappeared, presumably to testify against Sarah.  Locating Roman's current prostitute Sonia Reyes, Bosch persuades her to enter the courtroom at a crucial moment in Roman's testimony, which causes Roman to alter his testimony and effectively destroys the defense case.

While anticipating a plea bargain offer from the defense team during a lunch break, Bosch and Haller instead learn that Jessup entered Royce's offices with a gun and killed Royce, two of his legal team and a policeman who followed him.  Jessup is now at large, but the police surround and kill him at a hideout under the Santa Monica pier that had been discovered by Bosch as a result of the police surveillance activities.

References

Novels by Michael Connelly
2010 American novels
Novels set in Los Angeles
Little, Brown and Company books